The Parastylonuridae are a family of eurypterids, an extinct group of chelicerate arthropods commonly known as "sea scorpions". The family is one of two families contained in the superfamily Stylonuroidea (along with Stylonuridae), which in turn is one of four superfamilies classified as part of the suborder Stylonurina.

Description 
Parastylonurids are stylonuroids with a posterior second order opisthosomal differentiation and with spiniferous appendages II-IV akin to the genus Hughmilleria and non-spiniferous appendages V-VI akin to the genus Parastylonurus or Pagea.

Unlike the close relatives in the Stylonuridae, there are no adaptations towards sweep-feeding within the Parastylonuridae. They retain primitive Hughmilleria-like prosomal appendages II-IV unsuited for such a lifestyle, and they were likely scavengers instead of sweep-feeders.

Systematics and genera 
The Stylonuridae is classified within the superfamily Stylonuroidea within the Stylonurina. It is worth noting that the family Parastylonuridae as defined by Lamsdell et al. (2010) is paraphyletic, and knowingly made so, but was retained as it is due to the lack of complete material of either genus included within it, Parastylonurus and Stylonurella.

Family Parastylonuridae Waterston, 1979
 Parastylonurus Kjellesvig-Waering, 1966
 Stylonurella Kjellesvig-Waering, 1966

References 

Stylonuroidea
Silurian first appearances
Silurian extinctions
Prehistoric arthropod families